Dan Sarooshi  is an English barrister and academic, known for his expertise in international law, investment treaty arbitration, and constitutional law. Sarooshi has been appointed to the World Trade Organization Dispute Settlement List of Panellists and is currently the Professor of Public International Law in the University of Oxford and a Senior Research Fellow of The Queen's College, Oxford.

Career 

A graduate of the University of New South Wales in Australia, Sarooshi studied at the London School of Economics and read law at the King's College London. He was awarded an honorary MA from the University of Oxford.

References

External links 
 Oral Argument in International Court of Justice
 Oral Argument in International Court of Justice; at 40:19

Living people
Alumni of King's College London
Fellows of The Queen's College, Oxford
International law scholars
English legal scholars
Legal scholars of the University of Oxford
English barristers
University of New South Wales alumni
Alumni of the London School of Economics
Year of birth missing (living people)